Oliver Bierhoff (born 1 May 1968) is a German football official and former player who played as a forward. He has previously served as the national team director of the German Football Association. 

A tall, strong and prolific goalscorer, Bierhoff was mostly renowned for his excellent abilities in the air, and as a target man, being able to deliver pin-point headers towards goal.

Bierhoff scored the first golden goal in the history of major international football, for Germany in the Euro 96 final, a career-defining performance that vaulted him into the international limelight.

Club career
The son of a German utility magnate, Bierhoff played for nine different clubs, in four different countries. He scored a total of 102 goals in Serie A, one of the highest totals for a non-Italian in the league's history. In the 1997–98 season, he was the Serie A top scorer with 27 goals for Udinese.

Bierhoff, however, was never a success in the Bundesliga. After failing to shine in Germany, he got his chance in the Austrian Bundesliga. That gave him the chance at Ascoli in Italy. But it was at Udinese, under Alberto Zaccheroni, that Bierhoff found success and won his place in fame and in the German national team. He then transferred to Milan in 1998, winning the Serie A title in his first season with the club, scoring 19 goals in the league and 21 in all competitions, including the match-winning goal in the final, title-deciding match of the season, a 2–1 away win over Perugia. During the 1998–99 season, he set a Serie A record for most headed goals in a single season, with 15. After three seasons there, he moved to Ligue 1 side Monaco in 2001 for one year, before moving back to Serie A to play for ChievoVerona, where he retired at the end of the 2002–03 season. In his last game, he scored a hat-trick for Chievo in a 3–4 defeat to Juventus.

International career

Bierhoff debuted for the Germany national team in a friendly against Portugal on 21 February 1996. In his second appearance on 27 March 1996, he scored his first two international goals in his country's 2–0 win over Denmark. Altogether Bierhoff scored 37 goals in 70 caps, including both goals in the 2–1 win over the Czech Republic in the Euro 1996 final after having come on as a substitute.

In an important qualification match on 20 August 1997, Germany trailed Northern Ireland, 0–1, with 20 minutes left when the manager of the national team, Berti Vogts, sent in Thomas Häßler and Oliver Bierhoff. Within seven minutes the former provided Bierhoff with three assists, meaning Bierhoff had scored the fastest hat-trick in the history of the German national team.
In 1998, he was appointed captain of the national team after the retirement of Jürgen Klinsmann.

Bierhoff also played in Euro 2000, and both the 1998 and 2002 FIFA World Cups. In Germany's opening match of the 2002 tournament at the Sapporo Dome on 1 June, he scored in an 8–0 win over Saudi Arabia. He made his last appearance for his country on 30 June, when he was brought on during the second half of the 2002 FIFA World Cup Final against Brazil, but was unable to help the Germans score in the 0–2 loss.

Style of play
A large and prolific striker, Bierhoff was a strong, physical, aggressive, and powerful player, who played mainly as a target man in the centre-forward role. Although he was not particularly skilful with his feet from a technical standpoint, or a particularly good ball-player, he possessed good movement inside the box as well as strong hold-up play, but he was known in particular for his excellent aerial ability; in addition to his height, strength, and elevation, he was able to execute headers with power and precision, having scored several critical goals with his head throughout his career, for both club and country, which led him to be regarded as one of the best players in the world with his head and as a specialist in the air. In addition to scoring goals, Bierhoff was also capable of providing assists to his teammates with his head through knock-downs. Although he was less adept at scoring with his feet, he also possessed a powerful shot.

Managerial career
Bierhoff was a manager of the Germany national football team from 2004 until December 2017, a new position created as part of Jürgen Klinsmann's acceptance of the coaching job. Essentially the duties revolve around the public relations aspect of the team as opposed to coaching responsibilities. On 1 January 2018, a structural reform in the German Football Association took place and Bierhoff was named the technical director of the German national team (officially Direktor Nationalmannschaften und Akademie, "director national teams and football development"). After another early World Cup exit in 2022, Bierhoff had his contract terminated by the DFB, which was supposed to run until 2024.

Personal life
Bierhoff married Klara Szalantzy on 22 June 2001, Szalantzy was a model from Munich and former girlfriend of basketball player Dražen Petrović. She was behind the wheel in the fatal car crash that claimed Petrović's life. Bierhoff and his wife had a daughter on 27 January 2007. He is a Roman Catholic.

Bierhoff features in EA Sports' FIFA video game series; he features in the FIFA 14 Ultimate-Team Legends. 

He is a member of the A.C. Milan Hall of Fame.

Bierhoff was one of several celebrities in 2015 who endorsed the tabloid newspaper Bilds petition against anti-Islamisation group PEGIDA.

Education
Bierhoff took a correspondence course and graduated in 2002 with a degree in business economics from the University of Hagen.

Career statistics

Club

International

Scores and results list Germany's goal tally first, score column indicates score after each Bierhoff goal

Honours
Milan
Serie A: 1998–99
Germany
UEFA European Football Championship: 1996
FIFA World Cup runner-up: 2002
Individual
Serie A top scorer: 1997–98
Serie B top scorer: 1992–93
Goal of the Year (Germany): 1996
Footballer of the Year (Germany): 1998
FIFA XI (reserve): 1998
A.C. Milan Hall of Fame

References

External links

Oliver Bierhoff at history-of-soccer.org Retrieved 30 June 2013
 For 89–90 season with Monchengladbach

1968 births
Living people
German Roman Catholics
Footballers from Karlsruhe
German footballers
Association football forwards
KFC Uerdingen 05 players
Hamburger SV players
Borussia Mönchengladbach players
FC Red Bull Salzburg players
Ascoli Calcio 1898 F.C. players
Udinese Calcio players
A.C. Milan players
AS Monaco FC players
A.C. ChievoVerona players
Bundesliga players
Austrian Football Bundesliga players
Serie A players
Serie B players
Ligue 1 players
Germany under-21 international footballers
Germany international footballers
UEFA Euro 1996 players
1998 FIFA World Cup players
UEFA Euro 2000 players
2002 FIFA World Cup players
UEFA European Championship-winning players
German expatriate footballers
German expatriate sportspeople in Austria
German expatriate sportspeople in Italy
German expatriate sportspeople in Monaco
Expatriate footballers in Austria
Expatriate footballers in Italy
Expatriate footballers in Monaco
University of Hagen alumni